Smallhous is an unincorporated community in Ohio County, Kentucky, United States.

References

Unincorporated communities in Ohio County, Kentucky
Unincorporated communities in Kentucky